Cam Đức is an urban township (thị trấn), the district capital of Cam Lâm District, Khánh Hòa Province, Vietnam.

The township has an area of 1,583 hectares with a population of 14,831 inhabitants.

Neighbouring communes: Cam Hải Đông to the east; to the west, it borders Cam Hiệp Bắc and Cam Hiệp Nam; and Cam Thành Bắc to the south; Cam Hải Tây to the north.

Populated places in Khánh Hòa province
Communes of Khánh Hòa province
District capitals in Vietnam
Townships in Vietnam